Lawson Sabah (born 2 April 1997), often written Sabah Lawson, is a Ghanaian professional footballer who plays for AFC Eskilstuna as a central midfielder.

Club career

Early career
Sabah moved to Ghana's capital city Accra to pursue his football career for International Allies as a teenager. He cites the club's chairman Omar El-Eter to be the reason for going professional. He played several games in the Ghanaian Premier League between 2014 and 2015. In January 2015, he signed a 4.5 year contract with IFK Göteborg, but joined the Swedish side the following summer due to being under-age at the time.

IFK Göteborg
On 28 December 2014, he signed for IFK Göteborg. He made his senior appearance for IFK on 19 August 2015, playing 90 minutes in their 6–1 victory against Kristianstad FF in the domestic cup. His Allsvenskan debut came the following season, coming on as a substitute away against Östersunds FK in May. He came to play 11 games in the 2016 season, scoring his first goal in the last game of the campaign against IFK Norrköping.

Personal life
Lawson was born and grew up in Kumasi to mother Lydia and father Prince. He is a practicing Christian.

His role models are compatriots Michael Essien and Sulley Muntari.

Career statistics

References

External links
 
 
 Elite Prospects profile
 IFK Göteborg profile

1997 births
Living people
Ghanaian footballers
Association football midfielders
IFK Göteborg players
Allsvenskan players
International Allies F.C. players
Footballers from Kumasi
Varbergs BoIS players
FC Linköping City players
Ghanaian expatriate footballers
Expatriate footballers in Sweden
Ghanaian expatriate sportspeople in Sweden